The 1987 Porsche Tennis Grand Prix was a women's tennis tournament played on indoor carpet courts at the Filderstadt Tennis Centre in Filderstadt in West Germany and was part of Category 3 tier of the 1987 WTA Tour. It was the 10th edition of the tournament and was held from 12 October to 18 October 1987. First-seeded Martina Navratilova won the singles title, her second consecutive and fourth in total.

Finals

Singles
 Martina Navratilova defeated  Chris Evert 7–5, 6–1
 It was Navratilova's 3rd singles title of the year and the 124th of her career.

Doubles
 Martina Navratilova /  Pam Shriver  defeated  Zina Garrison /  Lori McNeil 6–1, 6–2
 It was Navratilova's 8th doubles title of the year and the 134th of her career. It was Shriver's 7th doubles title of the year and the 85th of her career.

See also
 Evert–Navratilova rivalry

References

External links
 Official website 
 Official website 
 ITF tournament edition details

Porsche Tennis Grand Prix
Porsche Tennis Grand Prix
Porsche Tennis Grand Prix
1980s in Baden-Württemberg
Porsche Tennis Grand Prix
Porsch